Chaoshan cuisine, also known as Chiuchow cuisine, Chaozhou cuisine or Teo-swa cuisine, originated from the Chaoshan region in the eastern part of China's Guangdong Province, which includes the cities of Chaozhou, Shantou and Jieyang. Chaoshan cuisine bears more similarities to that of Fujian cuisine, particularly Southern Min cuisine, due to the similarity of Chaoshan's and Fujian's culture, language, and their geographic proximity to each other. However, Chaoshan cuisine is also influenced by Cantonese cuisine in its style and technique.

Background
Chaoshan cuisine is well known for its seafood and vegetarian dishes. Its use of flavouring is much less heavy-handed than most other Chinese cuisines and depends much on the freshness and quality of the ingredients for taste and flavour. As a delicate cuisine, oil is not often used in large quantities and there is a relatively heavy emphasis on poaching, steaming and braising, as well as the common Chinese method of stir-frying. Chaoshan cuisine is also known for serving congee (or mue), in addition to steamed rice or noodles with meals. The Chaoshan  is rather different from the Cantonese counterpart, being very watery with the rice sitting loosely at the bottom of the bowl, while the Cantonese dish is more a thin gruel.

Authentic Chaoshan restaurants serve very strong oolong tea called Tieguanyin in very tiny cups before and after the meal. Presented as gongfu tea, the tea has a thickly bittersweet taste, colloquially known as gam gam.

A condiment that is popular in Fujian and Taiwanese cuisine and commonly associated with cuisine of certain Chaoshan groups is shacha sauce. It is made from soybean oil, garlic, shallots, chilies, brill fish and dried shrimp. The paste has a savoury and slightly spicy taste. As an ingredient, it has multiple uses: as a base for soups, as a rub for barbecued meats, as a seasoning for stir-fried dishes, or as a component for dipping sauces.

In addition to soy sauce (widely used in all Chinese cuisines), the Chaoshan diaspora in Southeast Asia use fish sauce in their cooking. It is used as a flavouring agent in soups and sometimes as a dipping sauce, as in Vietnamese spring rolls.

Chaoshan chefs often use a special stock called superior broth. This stock remains on the stove and is continuously replenished. Portrayed in popular media, some Hong Kong chefs allegedly use the same superior broth that is preserved for decades. This stock can as well be seen on Chaozhou TV's cooking programmes.

There is a notable feast in Chaoshan cuisine called . A myriad of dishes are often served, which include shark fin soup, bird's nest soup, lobster, steamed fish, roasted suckling pig and braised goose.

Chaoshan chefs take pride in their skills of vegetable carving, and carved vegetables are used as garnishes on cold dishes and on the banquet table.

Chaoshan cuisine is also known for a late night meal known as meh siao or daa laang among the Cantonese. Chaoshan people enjoy eating out close to midnight in restaurants or at roadside food stalls. Some dai pai dong-like eateries stay open till dawn.

Unlike the typical menu selections of many other Chinese cuisines, Chaoshan restaurant menus often have a dessert section.

Many people of Chaoshan origin, also known as Teochiu or Chaoshan people, have settled in Hong Kong and places in Southeast Asia like Malaysia, Singapore, Cambodia and Thailand. Influences they bring can be noted in Singaporean cuisine and that of other settlements. A large number of Chaoshan people have also settled in Taiwan, evident in Taiwanese cuisine. Other notable Chaoshan diaspora communities are in Vietnam, Cambodia and France. A popular noodle soup in both Vietnam and Cambodia, known as hu tieu, originated from the Chaoshan. There is also a large diaspora of Chaoshan people (most were from Southeast Asia) in the United States - particularly in California. There is a Teochew Chinese Association in Paris called L'Amicale des Teochews en France.

Notable dishes

Gallery

See also
List of Chinese dishes
Teochew porridge
Teochew people

References

External links
Yeo's Teochew Popiah Recipe
Jenius' Teochew peach shaped kueh Recipe

 
Chaozhou
Regional cuisines of China